The S5.98M, also known as the 14D30, is a Russian rocket engine, currently powering the Briz upper stages.

See also
Briz-M - The upper stage that is powered by the S5.98M.
Proton-M - The heavy lift rocket that uses the Briz-M stage.
Rokot - The light lift rocket that uses the smaller Briz-KM stage.
Khrunichev - The manufacturer of the Briz stage and the corporate parent of the designer bureau.

References

External links
 KB KhIMMASH Official Page (Russian, Archived)
 Khrunichev Official Page (Archived)
 ILS Briz-M Page, the commercial launcher of the Proton-M
 Eurockot Official Page, the commercial launcher of the Rokot

Rocket engines of Russia
Rocket engines of the Soviet Union
Rocket engines using hypergolic propellant
Rocket engines using the staged combustion cycle
KB KhimMash rocket engines